Martin Ševela (born 20 November 1975) is a former Slovak football defender and manager who is currently in charge of Saudi Arabian side Al-Adalah. Besides Slovakia, he has managed in Poland and Saudi Arabia.

Career statistics

Managerial statistics
As of 1 July 2021

Honours

Manager
AS Trenčín
Slovak First Football League (2): 2014–15, 2015–16
Slovak Cup (2):  2014–15, 2015–16

ŠK Slovan Bratislava
Slovak First Football League (1): 2018–19
Slovak Cup (1):  2017–18

Individual
 Fortuna Liga Manager of the season 2015-16

External links
AS Trenčín profile

Fotbal.idnes.cz profile

References

1975 births
Living people
Slovak footballers
Association football defenders
Slovak Super Liga players
FK Inter Bratislava players
FK Dubnica players
ŠK Slovan Bratislava players
AS Trenčín players
People from Senec District
Sportspeople from the Bratislava Region
FK Drnovice players
Slovak football managers
AS Trenčín managers
Zagłębie Lubin managers
Abha Club managers
Saudi Professional League managers
Slovak expatriate football managers
Slovak expatriate sportspeople in Saudi Arabia
Expatriate football managers in Poland
Expatriate football managers in Saudi Arabia
ŠK Slovan Bratislava managers